Infernö is a Norwegian thrash metal band. They formed in 1995, and are currently releasing on Duplicate records.
The band's most known member is Carl-Michael "Aggressor" Eide. He has been a member of Cadaver, Dødheimsgard, Satyricon, Ulver and Ved Buens Ende. He is also a member of Aura Noir and Virus.

Band members
Current members
 Hazardous Pussy Desecrator - vocals
 Bestial Tormentor (Olav Knutsen) - bass (Böh, Demon Cleaner, Lamented Souls)
 Necrodevil (Einar Sjursø) - drums  (Beyond Dawn, Lamented Souls, Virus (Nor))

Past members
 Aggressor (Carl-Michael Eide) - guitars (Cadaver, Dødheimsgard, Satyricon, Ulver, Ved Buens Ende, Aura Noir and Virus)

Discography

Studio releases
Utter Hell, 1996
Downtown Hades, 1997
Thrash Metal Dogs of Hell, (Single) 2004

Demos
Massacre in Hell, 1995

Split albums
Headbangers against disco vol. 1, 1997
Überthrash, 2004. 4-way split with Audiopain, Aura Noir and Nocturnal Breed.
Überthrash II, 2005. 4-way split with Audiopain, Aura Noir and Nocturnal Breed.

References

External links
  Infernö at Duplicate Records 

Norwegian thrash metal musical groups
Musical groups established in 1995
1995 establishments in Norway
Musical groups from Norway with local place of origin missing